The Last Song is a 1980 American made-for-television thriller drama film about a woman who as a result of a cover up involving toxic waste is being stalked by killers. It was directed by Alan J. Levi, and starred Lynda Carter, Ronny Cox and Nicholas Pryor. It was released in 1980.

Background

Story
Carter plays the part of Brooke Newman, a young mother and singer. She has something that is the key to exposing a cover up. Somebody murders her husband.  He was a sound technician who when recording some sound samples outside had recorded a conversation relating to a cover up involving toxic chemicals. She then becomes a target.

Soundtrack
A single "The Last Song" by Lynda Carter was released in 1980. It was written by Ron Miller and Kenny Hirsch.

Specs
 The film was the highest rated two hour CBS 2 hour movie of the year.
 VHS Release 1980

References

External links
 
 

1980 films
1980 television films
American thriller drama films
American thriller television films
1980s thriller drama films
1980 drama films
Films directed by Alan J. Levi
1980s American films